Hastings, Nova Scotia may refer to the following places in Nova Scotia, Canada:
 Hastings, Annapolis County, Nova Scotia in Annapolis County
 Hastings, Cumberland, Nova Scotia in Cumberland County